Richard Edward Lajeskie (January 8, 1926 – August 15, 1976) was an American professional baseball infielder who appeared in six Major League Baseball games as a second baseman and pinch runner for the  New York Giants.

Lajeskie's eight-year pro career began in 1943 in the Giants' system at age 17 during World War II. He spent the full minor-league season of 1946 with Triple-A Jersey City and was called to the MLB Giants that September. In six contests—four as starting second baseman and two as a pinch runner—he collected two singles, three bases on balls and one hit by pitch in 14 plate appearances. He scored three career runs but did not earn an RBI.

He returned to the minors in 1947, playing into 1951. Lajeskie died at age 50 in Ramsey, New Jersey on August 15, 1976.

References

External links

1926 births
1976 deaths
Baseball players from New Jersey
Jacksonville Tars players
Jersey City Giants players
Major League Baseball second basemen
Minneapolis Millers (baseball) players
New Orleans Pelicans (baseball) players
New York Giants (NL) players
San Francisco Seals (baseball) players
Sportspeople from Passaic, New Jersey